The Other Side is an album by the American go-go funk musician Chuck Brown and American singer Eva Cassidy. It was first released in 1992 by Brown's label Liaison records. The album comprises jazz, blues and soul standards and contains a mixture of solos and duets. It is the only studio album by Cassidy to have been released in her lifetime.

Track listing 

 "Let the Good Times Roll" (Shirley Goodman, Leonard Lee) - 3:12
 "Fever" (Eddie Cooley, John Davenport) - 4:16
 "You Don't Know Me" (Eddy Arnold, Cindy Walker) - 4:59
 "I Could Have Told You So" (Jimmy Van Heusen, Carl Sigman) - 3:31
 "Gee, Baby, Ain't I Good to You" (Andy Razaf, Don Redman) - 2:44
 "I'll Go Crazy" (James Brown) - 2:50
 "You Don't Know What Love Is" (Gene de Paul, Don Raye) - 4:40 (Chuck Brown solo)
 "Drown in My Own Tears" (Henry Glover) - 5:37
 "God Bless the Child" (Billie Holiday, Arthur Herzog, Jr.) - 3:18 (Eva Cassidy solo)
 "Red Top" (Ben Kynard, Lionel Hampton) - 2:55
 "Dark End of the Street" (Dan Penn, Chips Moman) - 3:55 (Eva Cassidy solo)
 "The Shadow of Your Smile" (Johnny Mandel, Paul Francis Webster) - 3:30
 "Over the Rainbow" (Harold Arlen, E.Y. Harburg) - 5:02 (Eva Cassidy solo)
 "You've Changed" (Bill Carey, Carl Fischer) - 4:00

Another track from these sessions, "Need Your Love So Bad", appears on the Eva Cassidy album Eva by Heart.

Personnel
Chuck Brown - vocals, piano
Eva Cassidy - vocals, guitar
Keith Grimes - guitar
Dave Lourim - guitar
Dan Cassidy - violin
Matthew Allen - strings
Philip Jehle - clarinet
Tom Crawford - saxophone
Donnell Floyd - saxophone
C.J. - saxophone
Gilbert Pryor - trumpet
The Reverend Pope - trumpet
"Little" Benny Harley - trumpet
Roy Battle - trombone
Lenny Williams  - piano, vibes
Mark "Godfather" Lawson - organ
Kent Wood - organ, synthesizer
Chris Biondo - bass, congas
Keter Betts - upright bass
Raice McLeod - drums
Jim Campbell - drums
Ju Ju House - drums
William Cook - congas
Darryl Andrews - percussion

References

Eva Cassidy albums
Chuck Brown albums
Covers albums
1992 albums
Collaborative albums